Ten Broeck or Ten Brock can refer to:

People named Ten Broeck
Abraham Ten Broeck (1734–1810), American merchant and politician
Dirck Wesselse Ten Broeck (ca.1638 – 1717), Dutch/American politician, businessman, and landowner
Dirck Ten Broeck (1765–1832), American lawyer and politician
Lance Ten Broeck (born 1956), American golfer
Robert Ten Broeck Stevens (1899–1983), American businessman

Other
Ten Broeck (horse), Hall of Fame racehorse
Ten Broeck, Alabama
Ten Broeck, Kentucky
Ten Broeck Mansion, historic American mansion in Albany, New York
Ten Broeck Elementary School, Canada
Ten Broeck Triangle, part of the Arbor Hill Historic District in Albany, New York
 The Ten Broeck Historic District, the original name for that historic district